Taufiq Febriyanto (born 12 February 1997) is an Indonesian professional footballer who plays as a defensive midfielder for Liga 1 club Persis Solo.

Club career

Persik Kediri
In 2019 Taufiq joined Persik Kediri in the Liga 2. On 25 November 2019 Persik successfully won the 2019 Liga 2 Final and promoted to Liga 1, after defeated Persita Tangerang 3–2 at the Kapten I Wayan Dipta Stadium, Gianyar.

Persita Tangerang
He was signed for Persita Tangerang to play in Liga 1 in the 2020 season, this season was suspended on 27 March 2020 due to the COVID-19 pandemic. The season was abandoned and was declared void on 20 January 2021. Febriyanto made his debut on 28 August 2021 in a match against Persipura Jayapura at the Pakansari Stadium, Cibinong.

Persis Solo
Taufiq was signed for Persis Solo to play in Liga 1 in the 2022–23 season. He made his league debut on 25 July 2022 in a match against Dewa United at the Moch. Soebroto Stadium, Magelang.

Career statistics

Club

Notes

Honours

Club
PSS Sleman
 Liga 2: 2018
Persik Kediri
 Liga 2: 2019

Individual 
 Liga 2 Best Player: 2019

References

External links
 Taufiq Febriyanto at Soccerway
 Taufiq Febriyanto at Liga Indonesia

1997 births
Living people
Indonesian footballers
Liga 2 (Indonesia) players
Liga 1 (Indonesia) players
Persiwa Wamena players
PSS Sleman players
Persik Kediri players
Persita Tangerang players
Persis Solo players
Association football midfielders
People from Sukoharjo Regency
Sportspeople from Central Java